The Dialogues with Solzhenitsyn is a Russian television documentary by Russian filmmaker Alexander Sokurov on Aleksandr Solzhenitsyn. The documentary shot in Solzhenitsyn's home shows his everyday life and covers his reflections on Russian history and literature.

References

External links 
 
 The Dialogues with Solzhenitsyn (English subtitles)
 
 
 
 

1998 television films
1998 films
1998 Russian television series debuts
1998 Russian television series endings
1990s Russian television series
1990s Russian-language films
Russian documentary films
Documentary films about writers
Films about Nobel laureates
Films set in Russia
Films set in the 20th century
Films directed by Alexander Sokurov
Russian documentary television series
Russian television miniseries
Aleksandr Solzhenitsyn